The 2013 Big East Conference baseball tournament was held at Bright House Field in Clearwater, Florida, from May 22 through 26. The event, held at the end of the conference regular season, determined the champion of the Big East Conference for the 2013 season.  Eight seeded Connecticut won their third tournament championship to claim the conference's automatic bid to the 2013 NCAA Division I baseball tournament.

It was also the last tournament for the original Big East Conference. Following several years of instability, culminating in a split of the conference along football lines, the seven member schools that did not sponsor Division I FBS football purchased the "Big East" name and formed a new Big East in July 2013. The FBS schools that had not moved to other conferences by that time joined with several new members and reorganized as the American Athletic Conference, retaining the charter of the original Big East.

Format and seeding
The tournament used a double-elimination format, with the field divided into two brackets.  The winners of each bracket faced off in a single championship game.  Seton Hall claimed the second seed over Pittsburgh and St. John's took the sixth seed over Notre Dame by tiebreaker.

Bracket

*Indicates game required 12 innings.  † - Indicates game required 10 innings.

All-Tournament Team
The following players were named to the All-Tournament Team.

Most Valuable Player
Billy Ferriter was named Tournament Most Valuable Player.  Ferriter was an outfielder for Connecticut.

References

Tournament
Big East Conference Baseball Tournament
Big East Conference baseball tournament
Big East Conference baseball tournament
College baseball tournaments in Florida
Baseball competitions in Clearwater, Florida